The Ministry of Energy, Water Resources and Irrigation is a governmental body of Nepal that governs the development and implementation of energy including its conservation, regulation and utilization. It furthermore develops operates electricity projects including hydropower projects. Due to the importance of water resources in Nepal, the ministry focuses on the development and utilization of hydropower.  In 2018, under the second Oli cabinet, the portfolio of the ministry was enlarged and the portfolios of Water Resources and Irrigation was added to the then Ministry of Energy, while the Ministry of Irrigation was discontinued.

Organisational structure
The Department of Electricity Development serves under the ministry to facilitate and implement its work, mainly to develop and promote the electricity sector of Nepal including enhancing its financial attractiveness.
Furthermore, two organisations also work under and with the ministry:
 Nepal Electricity Authority
 Water and Energy Commission Secretariat

Former Ministers of Energy
This is a list of former Ministers of Energy since the Nepalese Constituent Assembly election in 2013:

References

Energy
Government of Nepal
Energy in Nepal
Nepal